Hsu Tung-hsiung (born 20 December 1954) is a Taiwanese sports official and former swimmer. He won bronze medals in four events at the 1970 Asian Games, and competed in four events at the 1972 Summer Olympics.

Hsu was born in Taitung, and moved to Kaohsiung at the age of 12. Nicknamed "the iron man of swimming", as late as the 1980s he held thirteen national records in swimming. He later became the Dean of Student Affairs at Taipei Physical Education College, and in 2006 began pursuing PhD at Soochow University in mainland China. He was elected president of the Chinese Taipei Swimming Association in May 2011. He is the father of Hsu Chi-chieh, who also became an Olympic swimmer for Taiwan.

References

External links
 

1954 births
Living people
Taiwanese male swimmers
Olympic swimmers of Taiwan
Swimmers at the 1970 Asian Games
Swimmers at the 1972 Summer Olympics
Place of birth missing (living people)
Asian Games medalists in swimming
Asian Games bronze medalists for Chinese Taipei
Medalists at the 1970 Asian Games
20th-century Taiwanese people